USS Poinsett is a name used more than once by the United States Navy:

 , a sidewheel gunboat, was transferred from the War Department to the Navy Department in 1840 for service in the Second Seminole War.
 , launched 22 May 1944.

References 

United States Navy ship names